Stuart Charles-Fevrier or Stuart Charles Fevrier is a Saint Lucian professional football manager. Born in Curacao, he was raised in Saint Lucia where he is from. 
Recently, in February 2017, he became assistant coach for the Trinidad and Tobago national football team by a unanimous decision after being shortlisted for manager by the Trinidad and Tobago Football Association technical committee.

Playing career
Starting for Saint Lucia from age 15, he spent the majority of his career in Trinidad and Tobago. In his first years with Trintoc, he won the domestic league title with them.

Managerial career
After consulting his wife Claudia, he ventured to Trinidad and Tobago by invitation of W Connection president David John-Williams in January 1999 to coach W Connection F.C. Coaching W Connection F.C. since its foundation, he has won vast quantities of silverware throughout his entire career as a manager. According to David John-Williams, he was recommended by former professional Stephen Hart.

Over the years, Fevrier took a number of managerial training courses in Hungary, Brazil, and England, completing all the relevant other FIFA courses as well. 
Back in 2003, he took over as head director of the Trinidad and Tobago national football team from the sacked Hannibal Najjar until he was replaced by Bertile Saint Clair.
Through his whole career as coach he has won five titles with W Connection F.C. and came runners-up in the 2016-17 TT Pro League, trailing behind Central FC.

Achievements and honors
 TT Pro League: Champions(5): 2000, 2001, 2005, 2011-12, 2013-14. 
 Trinidad and Tobago Cup(4): 1999, 2000, 2002, 2013-14.
 Trinidad and Tobago League Cup(6): 2001, 2004, 2005, 2006, 2007, 2008.
 Trinidad and Tobago Charity Shield(3): 2012, 2013, 2014
 Trinidad and Tobago Classic(3): 2005, 2011, 2013.
 Trinidad and Tobago Pro Bowl(6): 2001, 2002, 2004, 2007, 2013, 2014.
 Trinidad and Tobago Goal Shield(2}: 2009, 2013.

International honors
 CFU Club Championship(5): 2001, 2002, 2006, 2009, 2013.

Individual awards

 Saint Lucia Medal of Merit 
 25 True Ambassadors- 25 people who have made a valuable contribution to Sport in Saint Lucia over the years.

References

External links
 Soccerway Profile
 Footballdatabase Profile

Living people
1959 births
Saint Lucian footballers
Saint Lucian expatriate footballers
Expatriate footballers in Trinidad and Tobago
TT Pro League managers
Saint Lucia international footballers
Saint Lucian football managers
Saint Lucia national football team managers
Association footballers not categorized by position
W Connection F.C. managers
Expatriate football managers in Trinidad and Tobago
Saint Lucian expatriate sportspeople in Trinidad and Tobago
Trinidad and Tobago national football team managers